Olivia Joyce Compton (January 27, 1907 – October 13, 1997) was an American actress.

Biography
Compton was born in Lexington, Kentucky, the daughter of Henry and Golden Compton. (Despite frequent reports to the contrary, her name was not originally "Eleanor Hunt"; she had appeared in the film Good Sport (1931) with Hunt and this confusion in an early press article followed Compton throughout her career.)  After graduating high school she spent two years at the University of Tulsa, studying dramatics, art, music and dancing. She won a personality and beauty contest and spent two months in a film studio as an extra.

Compton first made a name for herself when she was named one of the WAMPAS Baby Stars in 1926 with Mary Brian, Dolores Costello, Joan Crawford, Dolores del Río, Janet Gaynor and Fay Wray. Compton appeared in a long string of mostly B-movies from the 1920s through the 1950s. She was a comedy actress and protested at being stereotyped as a "dumb blonde". 

Among her over 200 films were Imitation of Life, Magnificent Obsession, The Awful Truth, Mildred Pierce, and The Best Years of Our Lives.

A devout Christian, on her gravestone, just beneath her dates of birth and death, is written "Christian Actress". She died from natural causes, aged 90, and was buried in Forest Lawn Memorial Park in the Hollywood Hills.

Awards
For her contributions to the motion picture industry, Compton was awarded a star on the Hollywood Walk of Fame on the south side of the 7000 block of Hollywood Boulevard.

Selected filmography

 The Golden Bed (1925) as Minor Role (uncredited)
 Sally (1925) as Minor Role (uncredited)
 What Fools Men (1925) as Dorothy
 Broadway Lady (1925) as Phyllis Westbrook
 Syncopating Sue (1926) as Marge Adams
 Ankles Preferred (1927) as Virginia
 The Border Cavalier (1927) as Madge Lawton
 Soft Living (1928) as Billie Wilson
 The Wild Party (1929) as Eva Tutt
 Dangerous Curves (1929) as Jennie Silver
 Salute (1929) as Marian Wilson
 The Sky Hawk (1929) as Peggy
 High Society Blues (1930) as Pearl Granger
 The Three Sisters (1930) as Carlotta
 Cheer Up and Smile (1930) as College Co-Ed (uncredited)
 Wild Company (1930) as Anita Grayson
 Lightnin' (1930) as Betty - Larry's Wife
 Not Exactly Gentlemen (1931) as Ace's Girl
 Three Girls Lost (1931) as Edna Best
 Up Pops the Devil (1931) as Luella May Carroll
 Women of All Nations (1931) as Kiki (uncredited)
 Annabelle's Affairs (1931) as Mabel
 The Spider (1931) as Butch's Girl Friend (uncredited)
 Good Sport (1931) as Fay
 Under Eighteen (1931) as Sybil
 Lena Rivers (1932) as Caroline Nichols
 Westward Passage (1932) as Lillie (uncredited)
 Unholy Love (1932) as Sheilla Bailey Gregory
 Beauty Parlor (1932) as Joan Perry
 Lady and Gent (1932) as Betty
 Fighting for Justice (1932) as Amy Tracy
 A Parisian Romance (1932) as Marcelle
 Hat Check Girl (1932) as A Party Guest (uncredited)
 False Faces (1932) as Dottie Nation
 Madison Square Garden (1932) as Joyce
 Afraid to Talk (1932) as Alice - Party Girl
 If I Had a Million (1932) as Marie - Waitress (uncredited)
 Luxury Liner (1933) as Girl Overboard (uncredited)
 Sing, Sinner, Sing (1933) as Gwen
 Only Yesterday (1933) as Margot (uncredited)
 Dream Stuff (1934, Short)
 Caravan (1934) as Party Girl at Beer Garden (uncredited)
 The Trumpet Blows (1934) as Blonde on Train (uncredited)
 Affairs of a Gentleman (1934) as Foxey Dennison
 Million Dollar Ransom (1934) as Millie - Hat Check Girl (uncredited)
 King Kelly of the U.S.A. (1934) as Maxine Latour
 Imitation of Life (1934) as Young Woman at Party (uncredited)
 The White Parade (1934) as Una Mellon
 Rustlers of Red Dog (1935, Serial) as Mary Lee
 Go into Your Dance (1935) as Café Showgirl
 Mister Dynamite (1935) as Check Room Girl (uncredited)
 Let 'Em Have It (1935) as Barbara
 College Scandal (1935) as Toby Carpenter
 Suicide Squad (1935) as Mary
 Magnificent Obsession (1935, unbilled) as Nurse (uncredited)
 Valley of the Lawless (1936) as Joan Jenkins
 Love Before Breakfast (1936) as Mary Lee
 The Harvester (1936) as Thelma Biddle
 Trapped by Television (1936) as Mae Collins
 Star for a Night (1936) as Ellen Romaine
 Sitting on the Moon (1936) as Blossom
 Murder with Pictures (1936) as Hester Boone
 Ellis Island (1936) as Adele
 Under Your Spell (1936) as Secretary (uncredited)
 Country Gentlemen (1936) as Gertie
 Three Smart Girls (1936) as Judson's Secretary (uncredited)
 The Awful Truth (1937)
 China Passage (1937) as Elaine Gentry - Customs Agent aka Mrs. Katharine 'Kate' Collins
 Top of the Town (1937) as Beulah (uncredited)
 We Have Our Moments (1937) as Carrie
 Wings Over Honolulu (1937) as Caroline
 Pick a Star (1937) as Newlywed
 Kid Galahad (1937) as Party Guest on Phone (uncredited)
 Rhythm in the Clouds (1937) as Amy Lou
 Born Reckless (1937) as Dora - at the Race Track (uncredited)
 The Toast of New York (1937) as Mary Lou (uncredited)
 Sea Racketeers (1937) as Blondie
 She Asked for It (1937) as Miss Hurley (uncredited)
 Small Town Boy (1937) as Molly Summers
 Wings Over Honolulu (1937) as Dixie Belle Lee
 Man-Proof (1938) as Guest (uncredited)
 Love on a Budget (1938) as Millie Brown
  Women Are Like That (1938) as Miss Hall
 You and Me (1938) as Curly Blonde
 Spring Madness (1938) as Sally Prescott
 The Last Warning (1938) as Dawn Day aka Minnie Schultz
 Artists and Models Abroad (1938) as 'Chickie'
 Trade Winds (1938) as Mrs. Johnson
 Going Places (1938) as Joan
 The Flying Irishman (1939) as Sally - a Waitress (uncredited)
 Rose of Washington Square (1939) as Peggy
 Hotel for Women (1939) as Emeline Thomas
 Reno (1939) as Bonnie Newcomb
 Balalaika (1939) as Masha (Lydia's maid)
 Escape to Paradise (1939) as Penelope Carter
 Honeymoon Deferred (1940) as Kitty Kerry
 Turnabout (1940) as Irene Clare
 I Take This Oath (1940) as Betty Casey
 They Drive by Night (1940) as Sue Carter (uncredited)
 City for Conquest (1940) as Lilly
 Sky Murder (1940) as Christine Cross
 The Villain Still Pursued Her (1940) as Hazel Dalton
 Who Killed Aunt Maggie? (1940) as Cynthia Lou
 Let's Make Music (1941) as Betty
 Ziegfeld Girl (1941) as Miss Sawyer - Auditioning Showgirl (uncredited)
 Manpower (1941) as Scarlett
 Scattergood Meets Broadway (1941, aka Blonde Menace) as Diana Deane
 Moon Over Her Shoulder (1941) as Cecilia
 Blues in the Night (1941) as Blonde
 Bedtime Story (1941) as Beulah
 Too Many Women (1942) as Barbara Cartwright
 Thunder Birds (1942) as Saleswoman
 Silver Skates (1943) as Lucille
 A Gentle Gangster (1943) as Kitty Parker
 Let's Face It (1943) as Wiggin's Girl (uncredited)
 Silver Spurs (1943) as Millie Love
 Swing Out the Blues (1943) as Kitty Grogan
 Roughly Speaking (1945) as Prissy Girl (uncredited)
 Pillow to Post (1945) as Gertrude Wilson (uncredited)
 Hitchhike to Happiness (1945) as Joan Randall
 Christmas in Connecticut (1945) as Mary Lee
 Mildred Pierce (1945) as Waitress (uncredited)
 Danger Signal (1945) as Kate
 Dark Alibi (1946) as Emily Evans
 Behind the Mask (1946) as Lulu
 Night and Day (1946) as Chorine (uncredited)
 Rendezvous with Annie (1946) as Louise Grapa
 The Best Years of Our Lives (1946) as Hat Check Girl (uncredited)
 Scared to Death (1947) as Jane Cornell
 Exposed (1947) as Emmy
 Linda, Be Good (1947) as Mrs. LaVitte
 A Southern Yankee (1948) as Hortense Dobson
 Sorry, Wrong Number (1948) as Cotterell's Blonde Girlfriend (uncredited)
 Luxury Liner (1948) (uncredited)
 Incident (1948) as Joan Manning
 Grand Canyon (1949) as Mabel
 Mighty Joe Young (1949) as Alice (uncredited)
 The Persuader (1957) as Julie
 Jet Pilot (1957, made in 1951) as Mrs. Simpson (uncredited)
 Girl in the Woods (1958) as Aunt Martha
 77 Sunset Strip (1958) Television series. Season 1 episode 7 "All Our Yesterdays" (uncredited)

References

Further reading

External links

 
The Joyce Compton shrine

1907 births
1997 deaths
Actresses from Kentucky
American film actresses
American silent film actresses
Actors from Lexington, Kentucky
University of Tulsa alumni
Burials at Forest Lawn Memorial Park (Hollywood Hills)
Actresses from Los Angeles
20th-century American actresses
WAMPAS Baby Stars